The Strumica (Strumicki dijalekt) is a dialect of Macedonian. It is member of the center subgroup of the eastern group of the Macedonian dialects. This dialect is mainly spoken in the southeastern part of Macedonia, respectively in Strumica and in the surrounding areas. The main characteristic is continuing the vowel.

Characteristics

Continuing the vowel (каде ќе одиш > дек ќе оош)
Dropping the vowel (полна > п'лна)
Use of the preposition у (во градот > у градо)

Personal Pronouns

Singular

Јас (I)
Ти (You)
Он (He)
Она (She)
Оно (It)

Plural

Нии (We)
Вии (You)
Они (Тии) (They)

Notes

Dialects of the Macedonian language
Strumica
Strumica Municipality